In mathematics, especially the theory of several complex variables, the Oka–Weil theorem is a result about the uniform convergence of holomorphic functions on Stein spaces due to Kiyoshi Oka and André Weil.

Statement

Applications
Since Runge's theorem may not hold for several complex variables, the Oka–Weil theorem is often used as an approximation theorem for several complex variables. The Behnke–Stein theorem was originally proved using the Oka–Weil theorem.

See also
 Oka coherence theorem

References

Bibliography

Further reading 
 – An example where Runge's theorem does not hold.

Several complex variables
Theorems in complex analysis